Joseph Jean-Baptiste Albert (1771 – 1822) was a French general de division (major general). He fought at the Battle of Eylau, the Battle of Aspern-Essling and the Battle of Wagram. He was made a brigadier general in 1807. He was involved in the French invasion of Russia in 1812. He was made a baron of the First French Empire by Napoleon Bonaparte. He was a grand officer of the Legion of Honour and a knight of the Order of Saint Louis.

References

1771 births
1822 deaths
First French Empire brigadier generals of 1807
Barons of the First French Empire
Grand Officiers of the Légion d'honneur
Knights of the Order of Saint Louis
Names inscribed under the Arc de Triomphe